Babulal Dahiya is a farmer and poet. He was awarded India's fourth highest civilian the Padma Shri.

References

Indian activists
Indian farmers
Year of birth missing (living people)
Living people
Recipients of the Padma Shri in other fields